Peggy Sue Vining (March 4, 1929 – November 26, 2017; née Peggy Sue Caudle) was the sixth poet laureate of the American state of Arkansas since her appointment to the position by Governor Mike Huckabee in 2003.

References

1929 births
2017 deaths
American women poets
Writers from Arkansas
Poets Laureate of Arkansas
21st-century American women